Kirkbank railway station served Old Ormiston, in the Scottish Borders, Scotland from 1856 to 1948 on the Jedburgh Railway.

History 
The station opened as Old Ormiston on 17 July 1856 by the Jedburgh Railway Company. To the east was the goods yard. The station's name was changed to Kirkbank on 20 May 1868, despite the fact that it was situated almost a mile away from Kirkbank. The station closed on 13 August 1948.

References

External links 

Disused railway stations in the Scottish Borders
Former North British Railway stations
Railway stations in Great Britain opened in 1856
Railway stations in Great Britain closed in 1948
1856 establishments in Scotland
1948 disestablishments in Scotland